Henry Roberts Pease (February 19, 1835January 2, 1907) was an American lawyer, educator, and politician who served as a United States senator for Mississippi from 1874 to 1875. He also served as the state's first superintendent of education and was a member of the South Dakota Senate for one term.

Early life and education
Born in Winsted, Connecticut, Pease received a normal school training.

Career 
Pease engaged in teaching from 1848 to 1859, studied law, was admitted to the bar in 1859 and commenced practice in Washington, D.C. During the Civil War, he entered the Union Army as a private in 1862 and attained the rank of captain; he was superintendent of education of Louisiana while that state was under military rule and was appointed superintendent of education of freedmen in Mississippi in 1867. In 1869, he was elected state superintendent of education of Mississippi.

Pease was elected as a Republican to the U.S. Senate to fill the vacancy caused by the resignation of Adelbert Ames and served from February 3, 1874, to March 4, 1875. He chose not to run for reelection. In 1875, he was appointed postmaster of Vicksburg, Mississippi by President Ulysses S. Grant, and he established and edited the Mississippi Educational Journal.

Pease moved to Dakota in 1881 and settled in Watertown (now South Dakota) where he was receiver of the General Land Office from 1881 to 1885. From 1895 to 1896 he served one term as a member of the South Dakota Senate, representing Marshall and Roberts Counties.

Personal life 
Pease died in Watertown in 1907; interment was in Mount Hope Cemetery.

References

External links

Henry R. Pease's record in the South Dakota State Legislature's historical listing

1835 births
1907 deaths
South Dakota state senators
Mississippi postmasters
Lawyers from Washington, D.C.
American newspaper editors
19th-century American newspaper publishers (people)
State superintendents of public instruction of the United States
Union Army officers
People from Winsted, Connecticut
Louisiana politicians
People of Connecticut in the American Civil War
Mississippi Republicans
Republican Party United States senators from Mississippi
Military personnel from Connecticut
Journalists from Mississippi
Journalists from South Dakota
19th-century American politicians
Mississippi State Superintendent of Education